Anna Jurčenková (born July 26, 1985) is a Slovak female basketball player. She currently plays as a captain for Piešťanské Čajky in Slovakia.

References

External links
Profile at eurobasket.com
Profile at fibaeurope.com

1985 births
Living people
Centers (basketball)
Olympiacos Women's Basketball players
Slovak expatriate basketball people in the Czech Republic
Slovak expatriate basketball people in Germany
Slovak women's basketball players
Sportspeople from Prešov